James Tarpey is a British actor. He was born in Greenwich, London, United Kingdom. He is best known for playing a Young Peter Page in the 2013 comic science fiction movie The World's End and playing Willow on the British sitcom After Hours since 2015.
James is a keen skateboarder and guitarist.

Career
James attended the BRIT school for performing arts. James made his stage debut at the Obie Theatre, London, playing the title role in Sarah Nivan's adaptation of Vernon 
God Little.

In 2012 he was cast as the lead in a short film called Callum, he played the title character Callum. James was nominated and won the 2013 Best Actor Award for the Cannes in a van, independent film festival award, for the lead role of Callum 

He played a Young Peter Page in the 2013 comic science fiction movie The World's End. In 2014 he played Damien in the movie The Beat Beneath My Feet and Nathan in the British independent science fiction movie Robot Overlords. He played Ted in the 2015 movie Hector. From 2015 he played Willow on the British sitcom series After Hours.

Theatre
James made his London professional stage debut in the widely acclaimed First Love is the Revolution at the Soho Theatre in October 2015

Selected filmography

Film

Television

References

External links
 James Tarpey on the Internet Movie Database
 James Tarpey on Twitter

British male television actors